Colesville is a town in Broome County, New York, United States. The population was 4,877 at the 2020 census.

The town is in the northeastern part of the county and is northeast of Binghamton.

History 

The area was first settled circa 1785. The Town of Colesville was established in 1821 from part of the town of Windsor. Robert Harpur, an early developer, has lent his name to the community of Harpursville. He is believed to be responsible for the many classical names assigned to communities in central New York.

The Seal to the Town of Colesville, New York was adopted in 2021.

Geography

The northern town line is the border of Chenango County. The Susquehanna River flows southward through the town.

Interstate 88 passes across the town. New York State Route 7 and New York State Route 79 are important highways in Colesville. New York State Route 235 connects with state route 7 north of Harpursville to State Route 206 in the town of Coventry, Chenango County.

Demographics

As of the census of 2000, there were 5,441 people, 1,944 households, and 1,458 families residing in the town.  The population density was 69.3 people per square mile (26.8/km2).  There were 2,189 housing units at an average density of 27.9 per square mile (10.8/km2).  The racial makeup of the town was 97.85% White, 0.29% African American, 0.31% Native American, 0.35% Asian, 0.06% Pacific Islander, 0.02% from other races, and 1.12% from two or more races. Hispanic or Latino of any race were 0.74% of the population.

There were 1,944 households, out of which 36.3% had children under the age of 18 living with them, 58.4% were married couples living together, 10.8% had a female householder with no husband present, and 25.0% were non-families. 19.2% of all households were made up of individuals, and 6.8% had someone living alone who was 65 years of age or older.  The average household size was 2.79 and the average family size was 3.11.

In the town, the population was spread out, with 29.4% under the age of 18, 6.5% from 18 to 24, 28.7% from 25 to 44, 23.9% from 45 to 64, and 11.4% who were 65 years of age or older.  The median age was 37 years. For every 100 females, there were 100.0 males.  For every 100 females age 18 and over, there were 98.6 males.

The median income for a household in the town was $38,444, and the median income for a family was $40,333. Males had a median income of $31,462 versus $22,917 for females. The per capita income for the town was $15,816.  About 6.7% of families and 10.3% of the population were below the poverty line, including 11.8% of those under age 18 and 9.5% of those age 65 or over.

Government

The current  town supervisor is Glenn S. Winsor (Republican).

Communities and locations in Colesville 
Belden – A hamlet northwest of Harpursville on NY Route 7.
Center Village - A hamlet south of Harpursville on NY Route 79.
Doraville – A hamlet in the eastern part of the town.
Harpursville – The principal community in the town, located on NY-79, with access from Interstate 88 Exit 6. The Harpursville United Methodist Church was listed on the National Register of Historic Places in 2006. 
Nathaniel Cole Park Pond – A lake located by West Colesville.
New Ohio – A hamlet in the northwestern part of the town.
Nineveh – A hamlet northeast of Harpursville and on the northern town line.
North Colesville – A hamlet in the northwestern part of the town on NY-79.
Ouaquaga – A hamlet in the southern part of the town.
Sanitaria Springs – A hamlet at the western town line, northwest of West Colesville on County Route 217; served by Exit 4 of Interstate 88. It was formerly called "Osborne Hollow."
Tunnel – A location south of New Ohio.
West Colesville – A hamlet on the southern town line.

References

External links
Town of Colesville official website
 Early history of Colesville, NY

Binghamton metropolitan area
Towns in Broome County, New York
Populated places established in 1821
1821 establishments in New York (state)